Barefoot Dances and Other Visions is an album by Jim McNeely released early in 2018. The album was recorded with the Frankfurt Radio Big Band in 2014. It was nominated for a Grammy Award for Best Large Jazz Ensemble Album in 2019, but it did not win.

Track listing 
All titles composed and arranged by Jim McNeely.

Personnel
Jim McNeely (as the primary musical artist) conducted the band.

Musicians 

 Martin Auer – flugelhorn, trumpet
 Günter Bollmann – trombone
 Peter Feil – trombone
 Thomas Heidepriem – bass
 Rainer Heute – bass clarinet, alto flute, baritone saxophone
 Paul Höchstädter – drums
 Manfred Honetschläger – bass trombone
 Christian Jaksjø – euphonium, trombone, valve trombone
 Tony Lakatos – alto flute, tenor saxophone
 Oliver Leicht – alto clarinet, alto flute, alto saxophone, soprano saxophone
 Peter Reiter – piano
 Heinz-Dieter Sauerborn – clarinet, alto flute, bass flute, alto saxophone, soprano saxophone
 Martin Scales – guitar
 Axel Schlosser – flugelhorn, trumpet
 Thomas Vogel – flugelhorn, trumpet
 Steffen Weber – clarinet, bass flute, tenor saxophone
 Frank Wellert – flugelhorn, trumpet

Production 

 Olaf Stötzler – producer
 Axel Gutzler – engineer
 Mike Wayszak – engineer
 Terry Lamacchia – cover art

References

2018 albums
Jazz albums by American artists